Gessica Rostellato (born 23 October  1982) is an Italian politician.

Born in Conselve and living in Cartura, Rostellato graduated in accounting and then worked as a labor consultant.

In  2009  Rostellato joined the 5 Star Movement and in 2013 she was elected deputy.  On 26 January 2015 she announced along with other eight deputies and one senator her exit from the party, and entered the new group Free Alternative. On 30 April 2015 she announced to join the Democratic Party.

References

External links 

Italian Chamber of Deputies - Gessica Rostellato

1982 births
Living people
People from the Province of Padua
Five Star Movement politicians
Free Alternative politicians
Democratic Party (Italy) politicians
Deputies of Legislature XVII of Italy
Politicians of Veneto
21st-century Italian women politicians
Women members of the Chamber of Deputies (Italy)